The Compagnie Meusienne de Chemins de Fer (colloquially Le Meusien) operated from 1888 to 1922 a  long metre gauge rail network in the French Département Meuse. Its most westerly branch was built by the Compagnie des Chemins de Fer d'Intérêt Local de la Meuse and commissioned section by section since 1878. The Société Générale des Chemins de Fer Économiques took over the network in 1922 and operated it until decline and closure between 1929 and 1938.

History

Construction 

The Compagnie des Chemins de fer d'Intérêt Local de la Meuse built and commissioned the first section of the local railway from Haironville via Revigny to Triaucourt from 1878 to 1881 and operated it until 1888. A short connecting line to Rembercourt joined the Triaucourt line at Les Merchines.

The concessionaire, Charles Varinot, had taken control of the line from Haironville to Triaucourt in 1888. The Compagnie Meusienne de Chemins de Fer (CM) took over the concession for the Haironville-Triaucourt line in 1888. Between 1891 and 1912,  it put additional lines into service from Bar-le-Duc to Verdun, Clermont-en-Argonne and Pierrefitte-sur-Aire.

After the First World War, Société Générale des Chemins de Fer Économiques took over the network in 1922 and operated it together with the Réseau de la Woëvre northeast of Verdun. It operated the entire network until its gradual closure between 1929 and 1938.

However, a 13 km section between Haironville and Robert-Espagne, which had been regauged to standard gauge in the early 1930s, was still operated by steam engines for freight traffic until 1971.

A 4.2 km section of line north of Bar-le-Duc was reopened as a museum railway.

World War I 
During the World War I, the locomotive fleet of the Compagnie Meusienne de Chemins de Fer (CM) was strengthened by requisitioning locomotives from metre gauge lines in other parts of France, so that up to 128 locomotives were used on the line. One of these was No. 55 (Corpet Louvet 1253/1909) from the Chemins de Fer Économiques des Charentes (EC). By the end of 1915, operational improvements made it possible to handle a very large amount of freight, which had increased from 800 to 1500 tons per day in addition to carrying 80 passengers per day. In the first five months of 1916, traffic increased to 137,367 soldiers, 84,888 wounded, 201,257 tons of supplies and 69,847 tons of ammunition and weapons transport.

During the war, the railway was popularly called "Varinot" after the name of its former concessionaire or "tacot" or "Tortillard" after the sound that it emitted. The military authorities called it the "Petit Tramway" and General Philippe Pétain described it as the "Petit Meusien". By improving the organisation of the traffic, the number of military transports increased from 22 trains on 21 February 1916 to 31 trains at the end of March to 35 at the end of April and finally even up to 48 trains between Revigny and Beauzée.

Post-war period 
The Société Générale des Chemins de Fer Économiques (SE) took over operations in 1922. In the post-war period, from 1919 to 1924, large quantities of building materials were transported along the line for the reconstruction of the destroyed buildings. The trains therefore ran on a timetable as mixed freight and passenger trains, which required numerous shunting manoeuvres in the stations to couple or uncouple additional freight wagons. Because of this and because the maximum speed was limited to 12 km/h, the journeys were very time-consuming.

Decline and closure 
As the economic viability was questioned by rising inflation, the operating company merged with the operators of the local railway lines of the Réseau de la Woëvre, located northeast of Verdun, on 1 June 1923. The merged company acquired more modern rolling stock, in particular railcars. On 20 June 1938, operations had largely ceased and the assets were sold. The liquidation was not yet completed with the outbreak of the Second World War in 1939. It was not until the end of Second World War that the company was fully settled in 1946.

Sections of track 
Revigny – Haironville: 
Revigny – Triaucourt: 
Bar-le-Duc – Verdun: 
Beauzé – Clermont-en-Argonne: 
Rembercourt-aux-Pots – Les Merchines: 
La Vaux-Marie – Pierrefitte-sur-Aire:

Stations and bridges

Locomotives

Duration of the sections' operation

References 

Metre gauge railways in France
Railway lines in Grand Est